Nilam is a 1949 Malaysian film, produced by director B. S. Rajhans.

Synopsis
The film tells the story of a young Javanese man, Ahmad, who leaves his village with a magic protective dagger given to him by his mother. He takes to the seas, eager to discover the world. He reaches the exotic Arabian coast, and travels all the way to Egypt, encountering belly dancers, harem women, etc. He meets Princess Nilam and falls in love. Nilam's father will allow Ahmad to marry her only if he brings back a blue diamond guarded by monsters at a faraway location.'

Cast
 Siput Serawak as Puteri Nilam
 S. Roomai Noor as Ahmad
 P. Ramlee as Rashid
 Siti Tanjung Perak as Suratna
 Neng Yatimah as Penari
 Suhara Effendi as Ruchi
 Daeng Harris
 Jaafar Wiryo
 Siti Zainab

References

1949 drama films
1949 films
Malaysian black-and-white films
Singaporean black-and-white films
Malay Film Productions films
Malaysian fantasy films
Singaporean fantasy films
Films directed by B. S. Rajhans